Izhak Nash (— roughly, "'Itsik Nash"; born June 23, 1989) is a Circassian-Israeli football player.

Career 
Nash was born at the Circassian village Kfar Kama at the Lower Galilee and started to play football at the local club, F.C. Kfar Kama. He was raised and educated at the Hapoel Tel Aviv youth team, and later, he was transferred to Gadna Tel Aviv Yehuda. After one year at Gadna, he signed with the Maccabi Herzliya football club. However, an injury prevented from him from continuing with the team, and forcing him to move to lower leagues.

In the 2009–2010 season, he returned to his village and played for F.C. Kfar Kama, where he was one of the major players from the team to qualify for a league. A scout for Maccabi Herzliya, his old team, in Kfar Kama saw his performance and signed him back to the team. After a moderate performance in the first season, he scored 19 goals in the second season and was selected as the best player. In 2012, he signed with Bnei Yehuda Tel Aviv F.C. and become the second Circassian player ever at the Israeli Premier League (after Bibras Natcho). After a few months, he was transferred to F.C. Ashdod on loan. He is currently the only Circassian player at the Israeli Premier League.

Nash has made one appearance with Bnei Yehuda in the 2012–2013 UEFA Europa League.

References

1989 births
Living people
Israeli people of Circassian descent
Israeli footballers
Gadna Tel Aviv Yehuda F.C. players
Maccabi Herzliya F.C. players
Hapoel Bnei Tamra F.C. players
Maccabi Kafr Kanna F.C. players
Bnei Yehuda Tel Aviv F.C. players
F.C. Ashdod players
Hakoah Maccabi Amidar Ramat Gan F.C. players
Hapoel Afula F.C. players
Hapoel Ironi Baqa al-Gharbiyye F.C. players
Hapoel Iksal F.C. players
Hapoel Kafr Kanna F.C. players
Liga Leumit players
Israeli Premier League players
Footballers from Kfar Kama
Association football midfielders